The following are lists of members of the National Parliament of Papua New Guinea by term:

 Members of the National Parliament of Papua New Guinea, 1972–1977
 Members of the National Parliament of Papua New Guinea, 1977–1982
 Members of the National Parliament of Papua New Guinea, 1982–1987
 Members of the National Parliament of Papua New Guinea, 1987–1992
 Members of the National Parliament of Papua New Guinea, 1992–1997
 Members of the National Parliament of Papua New Guinea, 1997–2002
 Members of the National Parliament of Papua New Guinea, 2002–2007
 Members of the National Parliament of Papua New Guinea, 2007–2012
 Members of the National Parliament of Papua New Guinea, 2012–2017
 Members of the National Parliament of Papua New Guinea, 2017–2022
 Members of the National Parliament of Papua New Guinea, 2022–2027